Worlds Apart is a 2008 Danish drama film directed by Niels Arden Oplev and written by Oplev and Steen Bille. The film stars Rosalinde Mynster and Pilou Asbæk. Based upon a true story, the film is about a 17-year-old Jehovah's Witness girl who struggles to reconcile her faith and her secret romance with a non-believer boy. Worlds Apart played at the 2008 Berlin International Film Festival and was submitted by Denmark for the 2009 Academy Award for Best Foreign Language Film.

Plot 
Sara is a teenager who lives with her family, who are Jehovah's Witnesses. The family's devout image is questioned when the parents divorce as a consequence of the father's infidelity. One night at a party Sara meets Teis, an older boy who takes an interest in her. Teis is not a Witness, and their relationship is rejected by her father, but Sara falls in love and begins to doubt her faith. Facing ostracism from her faith and family, Sara must make the toughest choice of her young life.

Cast 
 Rosalinde Mynster as Sara
 Pilou Asbæk as Teis
 Jens Jørn Spottag as Andreas Dahl
 Sarah Boberg as Karen
 Anders W. Berthelsen as John
 Sarah Juel Werner as Elisabeth
 Jacob Ottensten as August
 Thomas Knuth-Winterfeldt as Jonas
 Charlotte Fich as Jette
 Hans Henrik Voetmann as Vagn
 Catrine Beck as Thea
 Hans Henrik Clemensen as Erik

See also
 List of Danish submissions for the Academy Award for Best International Feature Film

References

External links 
 
 
 
 To verdener at Den Danske Film Database

2008 romantic drama films
2008 films
Films directed by Niels Arden Oplev
Danish romantic drama films
2000s Danish-language films